Peter Abelsson (born 14 July 1977) is a Swedish former football defender who played for Trelleborgs FF (two spells), Nybro IF, Viking and Malmö FF.

Honours

Malmö FF
 Allsvenskan: 2004

References
 Peter Abelsson statistics at altomfootball.no
 Peter Abelsson statistics at the Swedish Football Federation website

1977 births
Living people
Swedish men's footballers
Association football defenders
Trelleborgs FF players
Malmö FF players
Viking FK players
Allsvenskan players
Eliteserien players
Swedish expatriate footballers
Expatriate footballers in Norway
Swedish expatriate sportspeople in Norway